Zero Motivation (Hebrew title: אפס ביחסי אנוש, Zero on Interpersonal Relations) is a 2014 Israeli black comedy film directed by Talya Lavie. The film premiered at the 2014 Tribeca Film Festival where it received two awards. It was nominated for twelve Ophir Awards, and won six of them including prizes for writer/director Talya Lavie (although it was not awarded Best Film). It was the most successful Israeli film of 2014, seen by 590,000 people in Israel alone.

Plot
Zohar and Daffi are two soldiers trying to serve out their mandatory service with the IDF. On their way back to base after the weekend Daffi bumps into a new girl Tehila and, believing that she is her replacement, takes her under her wing. Daffi and Zohar work menial jobs with Daffi being forced to shred paper. After Daffi trains the new girl she goes to her supervisor Rama and explains that after writing letters to everyone she could trying to get a new position in Tel Aviv they have finally sent a replacement. However Tehila is not a replacement at all but has snuck onto the base to see a boy she slept with and fell in love with. After he rejects her she slits her belly and crawls into bed where she is discovered by the other girls in the morning. Daffi is crushed by her death realizing that she will not be replaced after all. However, when she complains to personnel the officer in charge tells her she herself got transferred by applying to be an officer. Daffi then gets a recommendation from Rama and a boy Zohar has a crush on and is transferred away. She and Zohar part on bad terms.

Left alone, Zohar is teased by the other girls for being a virgin. Irena, one of her co-workers, advises her to sleep with a boy as soon as possible. Zohar takes this advice to heart and flirts with a visiting soldier she meets while guarding the arms, setting up a date with him for the following night. Returning to her dorm room, she climbs into her bunk bed and it breaks. After she refuses to sleep in the only spare bed, where Tehila was found dead, Irena lets her sleep in her bed and sleeps in Tehila's old bed, where she hallucinates in the middle of the night that Tehila is there with her.

The following day Irena behaves bizarrely and the girls begin to believe that there is something wrong with her. Zohar offers to take her to the infirmary but instead prepares for her date with the visiting soldier. However Irena insists on coming on the date and behaves strangely the entire time. When Zohar and her date finally manage to be alone, he aggressively strips off her clothes and when she asks him to be gentle, he tells her she should have gone with a non-combatant. She asks him to stop; he ignores her but is stopped by Irena who pulls his rifle on him and humiliates him before finally letting him go. Once Irena and Zohar return to the office, Rama chastises them for not going to the infirmary. When Zohar explains that she was almost raped and that Irena saved her, Irena claims to have no idea what she's talking about, and Zohar realizes that Tehila's ghost must have left her. Unimpressed, Rama makes Zohar stay in the office all night cleaning. When she returns in the morning she is impressed that the office is spotless but soon finds that Zohar has shredded every record in the department and stuffed them in Rama's office.

As a result of destroying all the records, Zohar is sent to military prison, and Rama is discharged despite wanting to stay in the army and become a career officer. Meanwhile, Daffi finally graduates from officer training and instead of being placed in Tel-Aviv, receives Rama's old position. Despite trying to make the best of the situation Daffi finds that Zohar is insubordinate and rude. After she tries to punish Zohar, Zohar photocopies the old letters that Daffi wrote to try to get off base and posts them all around the base. Daffi in turn tries to delete all the computer game records that she and Zohar used to play together. The two get in a violent fight with staple guns and Daffi wins. However, instead of the games, Daffi accidentally deletes all the recently digitized staff records.

The two are arrested and when Daffi tries to admit her mistake, Zohar takes the blame for it. She is sentenced to more time in military prison while Daffi is demoted to a cushy office job in Tel Aviv. After she gets out of prison Zohar gives up on Minesweeper and becomes addicted to Freecell. She is transferred to the infirmary where she has sex with the soldier responsible for digitizing the military records, who suffered a nervous breakdown after she deleted them. Her service finally comes to an end, as E-mail replaces paper mail. She leaves the army base, helping Daffi draft another plea.

Cast

 Dana Ivgy as Zohar, a soldier who hopes to end her service time fighting boredom with Minesweeper sessions.
 Nelly Tagar as Daffi, a spoiled soldier who tries to transfer to HaKirya base, in glamorous Tel Aviv.
  as Rama, an officer trying to advance her career in spite of her unmotivated crew.
 Heli Twito as Livnat
  as Liat
  as Irena, a soldier of Russian origin.
  as Tehila, a smitten girl passing for a rookie soldier.
 Moshe Ashkenazi as Eithan, Zohar's date.

Production
The idea for Zero Motivation stems from a 2006 short film project from Lavie entitled The Substitute. Dana Ivgy also appeared in The Substitute.

Critical reception
On review aggregator website Rotten Tomatoes, the film received an 86% approval rating based on 44 critics, with an average rating of 7.3/10. The website's critical consensus reads, "Darkly funny and understatedly absurd, Zero Motivation is a refreshing addition to the canon of irreverent war comedies — and an intriguing calling card for writer-director Talya Lavie." On Metacritic, the film has a weighted average score of 69 out of 100, based on 18 critics, indicating "generally favorable reviews".

Awards
 2014 Tribeca Film Festival: The Founders Award for Best Narrative Feature (top juried award at the festival).
 2014 Tribeca Film Festival: Nora Ephron Prize.
 Grand Prix "Golden Duke" at the 5th Odessa International Film Festival

References

External links
 
 

2014 films
2014 comedy-drama films
Israeli comedy-drama films
2010s Hebrew-language films
2014 directorial debut films
Military humor in film
Films about the Israel Defense Forces